Ramiro Ramírez Estenor (January 27, 1896 – death unknown) was a Cuban outfielder and manager in the Negro leagues and Cuban League.

A native of Guanabacoa, Cuba, Ramírez made his Negro leagues debut in 1916 for the Cuban Stars (East). He went on to play into the 1930s, including stints in the Cuban League with Almendares and Marianao. He served as player/manager of the Cuban House of David/Pollock's Cuban Stars from 1931 to 1933. In 1948, he managed the Indianapolis Clowns.

References

External links
 and Baseball-Reference Black Baseball stats and Seamheads
  and Seamheads

1896 births
Year of death missing
Place of death missing
All Cubans players
Almendares (baseball) players
Bacharach Giants players
Baltimore Black Sox players
Cuban House of David players
Cuban Stars (East) players
Cuban Stars (West) players
Marianao players
San Francisco Park players
Pollock's Cuban Stars players
Negro league baseball managers
Baseball outfielders
Cuban expatriate baseball players in the United States